A two-tier tender offer is an offer to purchase a sufficient number of stockholders' shares so as to gain effective control of a firm at a certain price per share, followed by a lower offer at a later date for the remaining shares. For example, an investor may offer $50 per share for up to 51% of a firm's outstanding stock and then, having gained control, offer $40 for each of the remaining shares.

Two-tier tender offers have been regarded as controversial practices. In the United States, they have at times attracted the attention of members of the Securities and Exchange Commission.

References

Corporate finance